Spellcaster is a 1992 American horror film directed by Rafal Zielinski and starring Adam Ant and Bunty Bailey.

Plot
Orphaned siblings Jackie and Tom are elated to be chosen to participate in a treasure hunt alongside other players, for a prize of one million dollars. Set in an Italian castle owned by the mysterious Diablo, all they must do to win the contest is be the first to find the check. Also hunting for the money are several others that are highly competitive and willing to do anything to win. The contest is to be recorded for a MTV-esque music channel and sponsored by the recording company of pop star Cassandra Castle, who is to accompany the contestants throughout the hunt along with VJ Rex. Cassandra, however, is unwilling to spend any time with the contestants and prefers to spend all of her time drinking excessively in her private room. Upon a whim Cassandra makes a deal with Rex to hide the money on her person so none of the contestants can find it. Upon the end of the competition the two will split the winnings.

Once the contest begins the contestants begin a frantic search for the check, unaware of Cassandra's duplicity or that supernatural forces are picking the players off one by one.  Cassandra's plans are waylaid when the forces begin to torment her and cause her to lose the check, which is carried throughout the castle on a magical breeze. Eventually only Jackie, Cassandra, and Tom are left, upon which point they are unable to ignore that something is very wrong. As Jackie frantically searches for answers she discovers a room at the top of the castle containing a crystal ball and Diablo, who reveals himself to be a demon. He also tells her that he has captured the souls of the other contestants in the sphere and will take them all to Hell, as well as that his next victim will be her brother. Meanwhile Cassandra and Tom have romantically connected with one another. He also discovers the check, which has landed near him and Cassandra. Tom is shocked when Cassandra chooses to burn the check and warns him that the money comes with strings attached that he wouldn't want. She throws the check into a fireplace, only Diablo to magically summon her to his room and chastise her for ruining his plans, revealing that Cassandra had formed a contract with him and that he will be taking her soul to Hell as well. In exchange for her soul she gained fame and wealth, which she quickly realized was not worth the bargain and took to alcohol and drugs to numb herself to her reality. In order to save both Tom and Cassandra Jackie tries to bargain with Diablo, offering her soul in exchange for the both of them. Horrified, Cassandra chooses to destroy Diablo's crystal ball, which puts an end to his evil plans and brings all of the contestants back to life. This also frees Cassandra, who reveals that she convinced Diablo to give her back her soul and to instead VJ at the music channel. The film closes with Diablo hosting a music broadcast and announcing a new contest that will bring him all new victims.

Cast
 Gail O'Grady as Jackie
 Bunty Bailey as Cassandra Castle
 Harold Pruett as Tom
 Adam Ant as Diablo 
 Richard Blade as Rex
 Kim Johnston Ulrich as Teri
 Michael Zorek as Harlan
 Martha Demson as Myrna
 Dale Wyatt as Jamie
 Traci Lind as Yvette (as Traci Lin) (as Traci Linn)
 William Butler as Billy
 Michael Deak as Andy
 Donald Hodson as Bruno
 Marcello Modugno as Tony
 Albert Band as The Cook

Production
Shooting began during July 1986, at Castello di Giove. The 12th-century castle near Rome, Italy, had recently been purchased by Spellcasters executive producer, Charles Band, who intended to use it as a backdrop for multiple films. The script was written by Dennis Paoli and Ed Naha, who had frequently collaborated with Stuart Gordon. Band's Empire Pictures produced the movie.

Release
In 1988, Empire Pictures ran into severe financial difficulties, and was seized by a creditor bank. The releases of Empire's remaining films, in various stages of production at the time, were delayed. Spellcaster would eventually be released directly to video by Columbia TriStar in 1992.

Reception 
Review website Cinema Crazed rated the movie favorably, stating that it was "about as goofy an eighties horror film as it gets", and that it "is essentially like a gory, exploitative version of Willy Wonka." Variety called it an "effective if cornball monster film". MTV writer Eric Snider wrote that it was "definitely a movie that has 'MTV generation cult favorite' written all over it, next to 'clearance sale' and '$1.99'."

References

External links

 

1992 films
1992 horror films
1990s English-language films
American horror films
Direct-to-video horror films
Empire International Pictures films
Films directed by Rafal Zielinski
Films scored by Nathan Wang
Films set in castles
Films set in Italy
Films shot in Italy
Sony Pictures direct-to-video films
Treasure hunt films
1990s American films